The teachings of Joseph Smith include a broad spectrum of religious doctrines as well as political and scientific ideas and theories, many of which he said were revealed to him by God. Joseph Smith is the founder of the Latter Day Saint movement and is recognized by multiple Latter Day Saint churches as the founder. Beginning in 1828, Smith began dictating the text of what later became the Book of Mormon, and also began dictating written revelations he said were inspired by God.

Smith's teachings evolved over his lifetime until his death in 1844. They may generally be divided into roughly four periods, (1) an early period (1820–30) associated with the production of the Book of Mormon and founding of the Church of Christ, (2) a period (1830–33) associated with his effort to clarify and re-translate the teachings of the Bible, (3) a period in Kirtland, Ohio, and Missouri (1833–39) that produced the Word of Wisdom, the Book of Abraham, and the early development of the plural marriage doctrine, and (4) a late period (1839–44) in Nauvoo, Illinois, in which Smith further defined his views of the nature of God and the millennial theocracy.

Smith's teachings were published during his lifetime in several books, including the Book of Mormon, the Doctrine and Covenants (which included the Lectures on Faith), the Book of Abraham, and various essays he wrote in church newspapers. Many of his teachings were also published posthumously, including the transcription of sermons such as his King Follett Discourse, his writings in the official church history, and reminiscences of his teachings written by those who knew him.

Many of these doctrines (or aspects of them) have been considered heretical by mainstream Christians (see Mormonism and Christianity), and are the cause of much controversy regarding Smith. However, he and his followers maintain that most, if not all, of these doctrines are truth given to them through divine revelation and/or inspiration, and do not contradict but rather amplify the teachings in the Bible.

Early teachings (1820–30)

The earliest known doctrinal teachings by Joseph Smith were in the context of a probationary Methodist class he took in his adolescence, where he was described by one of his associates as a "very passable exhorter". His interpretations of scripture were sometimes considered "blasphemous", and eventually he withdrew from the class after announcing that "all sectarianism was fallacious, and all churches [were] on a false foundation". He taught that it was his mission to restore a true priesthood, but at the time, he acquired no followers.

In 1830, Smith published the Book of Mormon, which he characterized as a religious history of the indigenous people of the Americas. This book contained discussions and sermons teaching many traditional Christian doctrines, such as the idea that Jesus' death represents an atonement for the sins of humanity, that he was the Messiah, and that he was one with God the Father. However, some scholars interpret the book as portraying modalism rather than the traditional Trinitarian formulation. The book also promoted baptism by immersion, the practice of laying on of hands, the rejection of infant baptism, the existence of a Great Apostasy (thus making Latter Day Saint doctrine firmly Restorationist), and the rejection of secret societies for ill gain. The book taught that all humanity, good and bad alike, will be resurrected and become immortal, receiving back their bodies whole, as a free gift of Jesus, but that the wicked would suffer a "spiritual death" by which they would be forever separated from God. Some of the book's more unorthodox teachings within the context of Christianity include a positive view of the fall of Man, the idea that indigenous Americans were descendants of the Israelites, and the idea that the Americas were a chosen continent reserved only for the righteous.

The Book of Mormon also taught of an institutional church administered by elders, priests, and teachers, and these offices were included as part of the Church of Christ he founded in 1830. The book further spoke of a high priesthood to which certain people were pre-ordained before birth because of their extraordinary faith and righteousness, and Smith introduced such a high priesthood in 1831. The book spoke against having a paid clergy who did not work separately to support themselves.

The Book of Mormon further spoke of a city of Zion build in the Americas, which would be the biblical New Jerusalem. Smith elaborated in 1830 that the location for this Zion would be somewhere near the United States border among the Native American tribes, and the "elect" of the world would be gathered to this location during the great Tribulation that preceded the second coming of Jesus.

Teachings during Smith's translation of the Bible (1830–33)
Beginning in 1830, Smith began producing a new translation of the Bible. This translation was a source of new doctrinal teachings, also influenced by the conversion of Sidney Rigdon, a former Disciples of Christ minister who converted to the church in 1831 with his entire congregation. Smith's version of the Bible generally followed the Authorized King James Version, with small changes; however, he also introduced large new passages, including a preface to Genesis and a significantly expanded 24th chapter of Matthew.

Most of Smith's new teachings in this era were sparked by his deep review of the Bible. Whereas the Book of Mormon had required clergy to work independently and support themselves, Smith now dictated revelations providing for clergy following the New Testament model of traveling "without purse or scrip", meaning that they would work as full-time clergy and be supported solely by donations from the church or from those to whom they taught. Also in 1830, Smith taught a doctrine of voluntary religious egalitarianism known as the Law of Consecration designed to achieve income equality, eliminate poverty, increase group self-sufficiency, and create the ideal utopian society Mormons referred to as Zion. Members of the Church could deed their real estate to a Church body called the United Order, this property would be divided and allocated to incoming Saints as a "stewardship" or "inheritance". This doctrine was an attempt to recreate the religious communism practiced by 1st century Christians (Acts 2:44, 4:32).

In 1832, Smith taught a doctrine based on 1 Corinthians 15 known as the degrees of glory, holding that those who repent and are worthy will receive greater blessings than those who are wicked, the greatest of which is eternal life, which is to live with God in the celestial kingdom. Those who were not as valiant, or did not receive ordinances necessary for entrance into the celestial kingdom, would enter the terrestrial kingdom. Those who were disobedient and unrepentant would enter the telestial kingdom.

One of his teachings during this era that did not directly relate to his review of the Bible was the Word of Wisdom. Smith taught that the Lord revealed to him an adaptable code of health designed for Latter Day Saints, in which members of the church were asked to abstain from tobacco, hot drinks, strong alcohol, and to eat meat with moderation along with fruits and grains. In exchange for doing this, members were promised that they "shall receive health in their navel and marrow to their bones; … [they] shall run and not be weary, and shall walk and not faint," and "shall find wisdom and great treasures of knowledge, even hidden treasures." Compliance with this policy was not considered mandatory. A modified version which prohibits all alcohol, coffee, tea and prejudicial drugs but does not prohibit excessive meat or requires consumption of grain and fruit is a requirement for entering temples of the LDS Church.

Later Kirtland and Missouri teachings (1833–39)

Priesthood "keys"
Beginning in 1834, Smith began teaching the concept of priesthood "keys", and the requirement of literal priesthood ordination and a direct line of apostolic succession. Smith taught that he was the prophet, seer, and revelator of the restored church, and was given all the Priesthood keys necessary for the governance of the church by various angelic messengers in the Kirtland Temple and earlier, including Elijah, John the Baptist, and Saint Peter. He taught that he received revelations for the church from God, and was visited occasionally by angelic messengers.

Polygamy

There is wide evidence that Smith practiced polygamy (referred to by Latter Day Saints as plural marriage), and may have begun to do so as early as 1833. Polygamy (marriage to multiple partners) was illegal in many U.S. states, and in Western cultures was widely perceived as an immoral and misguided practice. The practice of polygamy was denied by the Church of Christ and most Church leaders, but not by Smith specifically. Many of those that practiced polygamy pointed to the theory that the patriarchs of the Bible might have had multiple wives, including Abraham and Jacob.

Although it has been alleged that Smith may have had children by his wives other than Emma (most historians believe he married at least thirty-three women, and probably as many as forty-eight), DNA investigations in three cases have established that their biological fathers were Smith's wives' other husbands. The DNA research, so far, has failed to confirm Smith's paternity for any children other than those borne by his legal spouse, Emma.

Most historians accept "sealing" records (in many cases notarized) as evidence that Smith taught and practiced polygamy. The records are supported by personal journals and diaries maintained by Smith's followers. These sources indicate that, though the doctrine was not widely taught during Smith's life, marriages of this type were performed for select members of the church in the early 1830s. Smith was married (sealed) to several dozen women, both during his life and by proxy after his death, though the records are incomplete. Evidence suggests that he may have cohabited only with his first wife, Emma, and she was the only one known with certainty to have borne his children. Historian Todd Compton notes that Smith's practices included elements of both polygyny and polyandry. In time, polygyny came to predominate. However, a very small minority of his followers believe the evidence is not legitimate, and that Smith did not advocate or practice plural marriage. It is not disputed, however, that Brigham Young practiced polygamy and had sexual relations with his wives as did other early leaders of the church.

Despite this evidence to the contrary, Smith is on record as having spoken against polygamy and claiming his innocence of these charges. Smith continued to deny practicing polygamy until his death. Critics cite this as a deliberate deception by Smith. However, many followers of Smith insist that his denial of practicing polygamy was an attempt to protect the church from any further persecution from its enemies.

Today, polygamy has been abandoned by the LDS Church for a century. Church members practicing it today would be excommunicated.

Ethics and behavior
A succinct statement of ethics by Smith is found in his 13th Article of Faith:
We believe in being honest, true, chaste, benevolent, virtuous, and in doing good to all men; indeed, we may say that we follow the admonition of Paul—We believe all things, we hope all things, we have endured many things, and hope to be able to endure all things. If there is anything virtuous, lovely, or of good report or praiseworthy, we seek after these things.

Smith said his ethical rule was, "When the Lord commands, do it".

He also taught:
that which is wrong under one circumstance, may be and often is, right under another. God said thou shalt not kill—at another time he said thou shalt utterly destroy. This is the principle on which the government of heaven is conducted—by revelation adapted to the circumstances in which the elders of the kingdom are placed. Whatever God requires is right ... even things which may be considered abominable to all those who do not understand the order of heaven.

Beginning in the mid-1830s and into the 1840s, as the Mormon people became involved in conflicts with the Missouri and Illinois state governments, Smith taught that "Congress has no power to make a law that would abridge the rights of my religion," and that they were not under the obligation to follow laws they deemed as being contrary to their "religious privilege". Smith may have thus felt justified in promoting polygamy despite its violation of some traditional ethical standards.

Nauvoo teachings (1839–44)

In Nauvoo, Illinois, Smith further defined his views of the nature of God and the millennial theocracy.

Nature Of God

According to LDS Church interpretation, Smith taught that Heavenly Father, Jesus Christ, and the Holy Ghost are separate personages, with Heavenly Father and Jesus having physical bodies of "flesh and bone", while the Holy Ghost has only a spirit body. God is the Heavenly Father of all mankind and that mankind is made in His express image (simply put, that humans look like Heavenly Father). The Community of Christ has a standard trinitarian interpretation.

Smith taught that Jesus, God's only begotten son in the flesh, is our example to follow, and that God loves mankind and wants them to progress to become like him.

Exaltation

According to Smith, all of mankind lived with Heavenly Father as spirits before they were born, and that men continue to live as spirits after their physical bodies die. He taught that the reason that mankind is on earth is to progress, and that this life is but a single step in our eternal progression, and part of the Plan of Salvation.

He taught that many of those who enter the Celestial Kingdom may be worthy for Deification (Exaltation), where mankind, as children of God, can eventually become co-inheritors with Christ and inherit all that the Father has — in simple terms, to become like God.

Families
Smith taught that families are a central part of God's plan for mankind, and an important part of growth and progression. He taught that if people live worthily, that their family relationships can last beyond death so that families can be together forever.

Because Smith taught the temple ordinance of sealing, the LDS Church teaches that it is the divine responsibility of every person to search out their ancestors and do their family history, so that parents can be sealed to children, and families united eternally; the LDS Church operates the largest genealogical library in the world for this purpose.

Temples

In 1832, Smith claimed to receive a revelation to build a building that could serve as a "house of God"—namely, a temple. He taught that within temples, ordinances would be performed necessary for the exaltation of mankind. Further, performing these ordinances by proxy for every person that has ever lived ensures that salvation will be obtainable to everyone. For those who are living, it is highly important to receive these ordinances, which make possible entry to the celestial kingdom. Ordinances are performed for both the living and the dead.

The ordinances performed in temples today are as follows:
Baptism and confirmation for the dead
Washing and anointing
Endowment
Sealing

Wentworth Letter

In 1842, Smith summarized many of the basic beliefs of the church in the Wentworth letter, which contained a series of short doctrinal statements that later became known as the Articles of Faith.

Major prophecies

Smith's claim to be a prophet of God has led to much controversy. Many of Smith's prophecies have apparently come true (those on the American Civil War, his own death, and the reaction to his teachings are often cited examples). Smith's supporters see this as evidence of his divine calling and prophetic ability. However, his critics claim many have not been fulfilled, suggesting that he was a fraud.

Notes

Joseph Smith